Eric Ladin   is an American actor.

Early life and education
Eric Ladin grew up in Houston, Texas, graduating from
The Kinkaid School in 1998.
He later studied at the USC School of Dramatic Arts.

Career
Ladin has guest starred as William Hofstadt on multiple episodes of the AMC show Mad Men and the HBO miniseries Generation Kill as Corporal James Chaffin. He has appeared in the films Toolbox Murders, Cursed and Left in Darkness. He is also the voice of the character Ellis in the cooperative first-person shooter game Left 4 Dead 2, as well as the voice of Cole MacGrath, the lead character of Infamous, in all media beginning with Infamous 2.

Ladin played Jamie Wright for two seasons in AMC's The Killing. He guest starred in the Law & Order: SVU episode "Rhodium Nights". He is the voice of Private Todd Kashima in Call of Duty: Infinite Warfare.

He garnered fame for his portrayal of J. Edgar Hoover in HBO's Golden Globe and Emmy Award winning series, Boardwalk Empire.

In 2019 and 2020 Ladin appeared as Gene Kranz on the Apple TV+ series For All Mankind and Chris Kraft on the Disney+ series The Right Stuff, both characters being NASA space flight directors. Ladin also has a recurring role as Los Angeles Times reporter, Scott Anderson, on the Amazon series, Bosch.

In 2020, Ladin starred in the feature psychological thriller film Painter with Betsy Randle.

Personal life
Ladin is married to fashion designer and stylist Katy Ladin. The couple have two sons. Ladin is Jewish.

Filmography

Films

Television

Video games

References

External links

Living people
American male film actors
Male actors from Houston
The Kinkaid School alumni
21st-century American male actors
USC School of Dramatic Arts alumni
American male television actors
Jewish American male actors
American male video game actors
American male voice actors
21st-century American Jews
Year of birth missing (living people)